Innsbrucker Ring is a U2 - U5 interchange station of the Munich U-Bahn. It is located under the Innsbrucker Ring and connects lines U2 and U5, allowing cross-platform interchange.

The distance of the U 2 line to Karl-Preis-Platz measures 868 m. The distance of the U 2 line to Josephsburg measures 1,576 m. The distance of the U 5 line to Ostbahnhof measures 1,602 m. The distance of the U 5 line to Michaelibad measures 982 m .

The station was opened on 1980-10-18.

References

External links

Munich U-Bahn stations
Railway stations in Germany opened in 1980
1980 establishments in West Germany